Lake Mbakaou, also known as Mbakaou reservoir, is an artificial lake in Cameroon. The lake was formed by the construction of a dam and is fed by the Sanaga River. The closest settlement is the fishing village of Mbakaou. The lake's surface area has been calculated at 500 km2, but can fluctuate as the volume of the lake changes.

References 

Lakes of Cameroon